Marsiling Park, formerly Woodlands Town Garden, is a community park in Woodlands, Singapore, located at Woodlands Centre Road, adjacent to Bukit Timah Expressway.

Background
In its last decade before its upgrading works in 2016, the park was infamously known for its vice activities. Following the complaints from the residents whom lived nearby, the park was closed for upgrading in July 2016.

The park was renamed as Marsiling Park and reopened on 29 April 2018.

See also
List of Parks in Singapore

References

External links
National Parks Board, Singapore

Gardens in Singapore
Parks in Singapore